Coprinopsis pulchricaerulea is a species of mushroom-producing fungus in the family Psathyrellaceae.

Taxonomy 
It was first described in 2022 by the mycologists Teresa Lebel, Mahajabeen Padamsee and Tom May and classified as Coprinopsis pulchricaerulea based on DNA analysis which placed it close to Coprinopsis aesontiensis genetically. Unlike C. aesontiensis however C. pulchricaerulea is blue.

Discovery 
This species was first discovered by nature photographer Stephen Axford in 2012 growing in subtropical forests in northern New South Wales, Australia. Specimens were sent to the mycologists Teresa Lebel and Tom May at the State Herbarium of South Australia where DNA analysis was performed. The species has been erroneously called Leratiomyces atrovirens, especially by many media sources covering the discovery. However the DNA results do not support this and Leratiomyces atrovirens has never been validly published as a name.

Description 
Coprinopsis pulchricaerulea is a small blue mushroom found rarely in Australia. It can appear to resemble a secotioid fungus due to the cap which may only partially open and the indistinct structure of the hymenium.

Cap: 8-28mm wide by 6-22mm tall. Starts spherical becoming ovate to convex with age. Pale or bright blue in colour discolouring with grey or green shades with age or when dry. Cap is fragile and covered in fine glistening white powdery warts which may wash off. Specimens collected in New Caledonia had fewer of these warts or were lacking them entirely. Gills: Start white or pale cream maturing to pale tan. Crowded. Stem: 5-20mm long and 3-7mm in diameter. Slightly bulbous base which tapers towards the cap. Has a stem ring towards the base. Spores: Ellipsoid to elongate without germ pore. Nondextrinoid.19–23 x 10–12.5 μm. Taste: Indistinct. Smell: Strong mushroom like smell.

Habitat and distribution 
The specimens examined were found in a small areas of subtropical rainforest in New South Wales, New Caledonia and on Lord Howe Island in Australia. It grows solitary or in small groups in decaying leaf litter or wood in wet forests or rainforests.

Etymology 
The specific epithet pulchricaerulea derives from the Latin pulcher meaning beautiful and caeruleus meaning blue, a reference to the spectacular blue colour of the mushrooms.

Similar species 
DNA analysis shows that Coprinopsis aesontiensis is closely related. However this species has a grey cap as opposed to blue and is found in North Eastern Italy.

References 

pulchricaerulea
Fungi described in 2022
Fungi of Australia